Chaloem Wat Chat Bridge (sometimes shortened to Saphan Wan Chat) is a bridge and four-way intersection in the area of Bang Lamphu, Bowon Niwet and Ban Phan Thom sub-districts, Phra Nakhon district, Bangkok. It's not far from Khao San and Rambuttri roads.

Chaloem Wan Chat Bridge is a bridge across Khlong Rop Krung (around the city canal) or popularly known as Khlong Bang Lamphu on Prachathipatai road, considered as the beginning point of Prachathipatai road and the tip of Dinso road. The bridge was built in 1940 in the era of government of Field Marshal Plaek Phibunsongkhram to celebrate the national day of Thailand. At that time, falls on December 10, which is a memorial day at the King Prajadhipok (Rama VII) gave a first permanent constitution. Nowadays, Thailand's national day is December 5, the birthday of King Bhumibol (Rama IX) and December 10 became the Constitution Day.

Around the bridge is well known for its numerous national flag and other types of flags includes portrait frames stores that have been operating since the past, also hostels, restaurants and cafés serving tourists like the nearby Khao San road.

Surroundings
Wat Bowonniwet
Palace Gate Remnants
Democracy Monument
Wat Tri Thotsathep
Ban Phan Thom–the last community of silversmiths in Bangkok
Queen Sirikit Gallery

References 

Bridges in Bangkok
Road junctions in Bangkok
1940 establishments in Thailand
Phra Nakhon district
Neighbourhoods of Bangkok